The 2019 season was the Oakland Raiders' 60th since they were founded, their 50th in the National Football League (NFL) and their second under head coach Jon Gruden since his rehiring by the organization (sixth overall). It was the Raiders’ and NFL’s last season in Oakland. The Raiders finished the season 7–9, improving on the prior season 4–12 record, but failing to make the playoffs for the third straight year and the 16th time in the last 17 years.

The Raiders were not eliminated from playoff contention until the final week of the season after losing to the Denver Broncos. Although they surprisingly started the season 6–4, leading some to believe they could potentially challenge the Kansas City Chiefs for the AFC West title, the Raiders would suffer a late season collapse losing five of their last six games, including the last game in Oakland to the Jacksonville Jaguars.

After initially stating they would not return to RingCentral Coliseum for 2019, the Raiders were effectively forced to return to the stadium after their regional rivals, the San Francisco 49ers, blocked an effort to play at Oracle Park while they awaited the completion of Allegiant Stadium in Paradise, Nevada. This was the 25th and final season in the team's second tenure in Oakland and marked the end of the team's longest continuous tenure in one city. It was announced on June 11, 2019 that the Raiders would be featured on HBO's Hard Knocks, premiering on August 6, 2019.

Prior to the season, the Raiders hired former NFL Network draft guru and former Notre Dame Football on NBC color commentator Mike Mayock as general manager.

To commemorate their 60th season, the Raiders wore a special logo which incorporated the torch lit at Raider games in honor of former owner Al Davis.

Stadium negotiations
In December 2018, the Raiders indicated they would not return to the Oakland–Alameda County Coliseum (renamed RingCentral Coliseum under a naming rights deal secured in May 2019) upon the expiration of its lease on the stadium after the Oakland-Alameda County Coliseum Authority filed a lawsuit against the team, seeking financial damages, and would be seeking another venue for the 2019 season. The Raiders then began negotiating a lease with Oracle Park in San Francisco in February 2019; however, the San Francisco 49ers refused to waive their territorial rights, effectively vetoing the deal. The team briefly negotiated for sharing Levi's Stadium with the 49ers, but the proposal was reportedly rejected for costing more than the Coliseum's asking price.

Unlike the case of the Tennessee Titans, in which the team played in Memphis' Liberty Bowl Memorial Stadium for 1997 and Nashville's Vanderbilt Stadium for 1998 until their new stadium was completed in 1999, the state of Nevada's two largest college stadiums, Mackay Stadium in Reno and Sam Boyd Stadium in Whitney, were either rejected or never considered.

On February 25, 2019, the Raiders reached an agreement in principle with the Coliseum Authority to return to the Coliseum for at least the 2019 season. Rent for the 2019 season cost the team $7.5 million, and rent for the 2020 season would have increased to $10.5 million if the option was invoked due to construction delays to Allegiant Stadium; the option for the 2020 season was never exercised. As part of the lease agreement, the Raiders did not receive naming rights revenue from RingCentral, and game-day expenses for the Coliseum Authority would also be capped. On March 15, 2019, the Coliseum Authority voted to approve the lease, while the Alameda County Board of Supervisors and Oakland City Council voted in favor of the lease on March 19 and 21, respectively, clearing all legal hurdles in time for the NFL's owners meetings on March 24.

Roster transactions

Free agents signed

Players released

Players lost

Acquired in trade

Traded away

Draft

Draft trades

Staff

Final roster

Preseason
The Raiders' preseason opponents and schedule were announced in the spring. On March 27, Green Bay Packers President Mark H. Murphy stated during the league owners' meetings that the Packers and Raiders were in negotiations to play a preseason game August 22 at Investors Group Field in Winnipeg, Manitoba, with the Raiders as the designated home team. Mosaic Stadium in Regina, Saskatchewan was another potential site for the game, and the teams secured the cooperation of the city and local sports promoter On Ice Management, but the Saskatchewan Roughriders vetoed the proposal; the Roughriders feared they would be unable to reconfigure the field from NFL to CFL standards in time for the Roughriders' August 24 home game. When the preseason schedule was released, the August 22 Packers-Raiders game was subtly noted as a neutral-site contest, with no location identified. The Raiders confirmed the Winnipeg game June 5. Had the Winnipeg negotiations fallen through, or in the event the game cannot be held in Winnipeg, the game would be moved to Lambeau Field, thus effectively giving the Raiders only one home game and three away games.

Shortly before the game started, 33 Packers players (among them starting quarterback Aaron Rodgers) raised objections to the turf fill used to patch the holes where the goal posts had been in their CFL configurations and refused to play. In an unsuccessful effort to assuage those concerns, the league reconfigured the field such that the field was shortened to 80 yards and the last ten yards on each end was converted to end zones.

Regular season

Schedule

Note: Intra-division opponents are in bold text.

Game summaries

Week 1: vs. Denver Broncos

Just days before the game, the Raiders released wide receiver Antonio Brown, who was acquired via trade prior to the season, stemming from conduct detrimental to the team, including a heated argument with general manager Mike Mayock. However, the Raiders played well without Brown, as quarterback Derek Carr, wide receiver Tyrell Williams, and rookie running back Josh Jacobs all had strong performances, with the defense stifling Broncos quarterback Joe Flacco for much of the game. With a statement win, the Raiders opened their final season in Oakland at 1–0.

Week 2: vs. Kansas City Chiefs

Against traditional rival Kansas City, Oakland took a 10–0 lead in the first quarter, but the Chiefs stormed back with four touchdown passes from quarterback Patrick Mahomes in the second quarter. Despite the Chiefs being hampered by injuries to key offensive players such as Mahomes, Damien Williams and LeSean McCoy in the second half, the Raiders could not take advantage as Derek Carr threw two interceptions in the third quarter, and the offense was forced to punt on its final two possessions of the game. Oakland fell to 1–1 with the loss. This was the final football game at the Coliseum with the baseball diamond present.

Week 3: at Minnesota Vikings

Week 4: at Indianapolis Colts

After two consecutive losses, Oakland surprised the Colts by taking a 21–10 halftime lead. Though the Colts managed to cut the Raiders' lead to seven by the fourth quarter, Colts quarterback Jacoby Brissett threw a crucial pick-six to Raiders safety Erik Harris just before the two-minute warning, effectively putting the game away for Oakland. With the win, the Raiders improved to 2–2. Linebacker Vontaze Burfict was ejected from the game and later suspended the rest of the season for initiating two helmet-to-helmet hits, including one on Colts tight end Jack Doyle.

Week 5: vs. Chicago Bears
NFL London Games

The Raiders headed off to England for an international game against the Bears and former Raiders linebacker Khalil Mack, who was traded to Chicago prior to the previous season. Like the previous week, Oakland surged to an early lead, this time behind strong play from Josh Jacobs. Chicago took the lead in the third quarter with 21 unanswered points, but the Raiders eventually answered with a rushing touchdown from Jacobs with just under two minutes left in the game. Oakland's defense intercepted Bears quarterback Chase Daniel on the next drive, then snuffed out a final comeback attempt in the final seconds of the game. With the win, Oakland entered its bye week at 3–2.

Week 7: at Green Bay Packers

Week 8: at Houston Texans

Week 9: vs. Detroit Lions

Week 10: vs. Los Angeles Chargers

With the win, the Raiders improved on their 4–12 record from the previous season.

Week 11: vs. Cincinnati Bengals
 The win over the Bengals marked the final win for the Raiders in Oakland, as the Raiders lost their last 2 games at the Coliseum.

Week 12: at New York Jets

Week 13: at Kansas City Chiefs

Week 14: vs. Tennessee Titans

Week 15: vs. Jacksonville Jaguars

Despite holding a 16–6 lead late in the fourth quarter, Oakland allowed a touchdown pass from Jaguars quarterback Gardner Minshew to Chris Conley, then failed to run out the clock and missed the subsequent field goal attempt. Jacksonville would capitalize on the ensuing drive as Minshew and Conley connected again for a game-winning touchdown. This was the Raiders' final game played in Oakland before relocating to Las Vegas for the 2020 season. Fans booed the team as they exited the field for the last time. With their fourth straight loss, the Raiders fell to 6–8, but remained in the playoff hunt as the Pittsburgh Steelers would lose later that night.

Week 16: at Los Angeles Chargers

This was the Chargers' final home game at Dignity Health Sports Park before moving into their new stadium in the 2020 season. This was also the last time the Raiders and Chargers faced each other—home or away—prior to the Raiders' relocation to Las Vegas in 2020. As a result, this was the last meeting against the two rivals as California-based franchises. This also turned out to be the Raiders final win as the "Oakland Raiders". With the win, the Raiders snapped their 4-game losing streak, improving to 7–8 and keeping their slim playoff hopes alive.

Week 17: at Denver Broncos

Standings

Division

Conference

References

External links

Oakland
Oakland Raiders seasons
Oakland Raiders
2010s in Oakland, California